Angelica lucida is a species of angelica known by the common names seacoast angelica and sea-watch. It is also one of many species in the celery family which are casually called wild celery.

As its common names suggest, this plant is found most often along the coastline. Its distribution includes the Atlantic, Pacific, and Arctic coasts of North America, and the Russian Far East. The species can occur far inland in Arctic climates such as Alaska.

Angelica lucida is considered an endangered species in some of the Northeastern United States.

Angelica lucida  is generally similar in appearance to other angelicas, with tall, dense umbels of yellowish-white flowers.

References

External links

United States Department of Agriculture Plants Profile
Jepson Manual Treatment
Calphotos Photo gallery, University of California
Lady Bird Johnson Wildflower Center, University of Texas

lucida
Flora of North America
Flora of the Russian Far East
Plants described in 1753
Taxa named by Carl Linnaeus